Apophlaea is a genus of thalloid algae that is endemic to New Zealand. This genus has two species, both from the high intertidal zone on New Zealand's coasts. Specimens can reach around 15 cm in size. The thalli take a crustose form, but also contain upright, branching frond-like protrusions that reach 5–8 cm in height. Secondary pit connections and secondary pit connectionsare present in the organisms. Apophlaea reproduces by means of conceptacles; it produces tetraspores.

It is notable for its symbiotic relationship with certain fungi.  Despite its unusual morphology, molecular systematics, along with its zoned tetrasporangia borne in conceptacles with a single opening, place it within the Hildenbrandiales.

The algae are resistant to both U-V radiation and desiccation, allowing them to thrive in intertidal settings.  Indeed, they can resume almost full photosynthesis just minutes after losing 95% of their tissue water.

References

External links 

 http://thinkoholic.com/pic.php?l=de&resize=1&s=396&img=4194
 http://www.seafriends.org.nz/enviro/habitat/rsred.htm

Red algae genera